Maria Eugenia Girón is a Spanish businesswoman born in Madrid who was the Chief Executive Officer of Carrera y Carrera jewellers from 1999 to 2006. During her career she worked for Loewe, lastly as International Department Director; taught International Marketing at Universidad Pontificia de Comillas. ICADE; was a consultant to the Guggenheim Museum, as well as a Senior Financial Analyst for the First National Bank of Chicago.

In 2004, Maria Eugenia Girón has been awarded as best manager director by FEDEPE (Professional and Manager Women Spanish Federation). 

Maria Eugenia Girón holds a Master of Business Administration with Harvard Graduate School of Business Administration Boston, MA as well as a Degree in Industrial Engineering with the Technical School of Industrial Engineering– ICAI. Universidad Pontificia de Comillas in Madrid, Spain.

References

Year of birth missing (living people)
Living people
Spanish chief executives
Harvard Business School alumni
Women chief executives
Comillas Pontifical University alumni